Silver Lake State Park is a  state park located near the south end of Silver Lake in the Town of Castile in Wyoming County, New York.

The park offers picnic tables, hiking, fishing, seasonal deer and small game hunting, cross-country skiing, and a boat launch.

See also
 List of New York state parks

References

External links
 New York State Parks: Silver Lake State Park

State parks of New York (state)
Parks in Wyoming County, New York